Arirang is a North Korean Android smartphone announced on 10 August 2013. The phone was distributed to local sales points operated by mobile operators such as Koryolink to be sold together with 3G SIMs or as a stand-alone device. It is named after the "Arirang" Korean folk song.

The Korean Central News Agency (KCNA), North Korea's state news agency, reported that the phone, which utilizes a touch screen and a camera with "high pixels," is produced entirely within North Korea. The phone appears to run a derivative of the Android operating system.
Blogger Martyn Williams has expressed skepticism, commenting that the phone may actually be produced in China and then inspected or completed in North Korea. Kim Jong-un has expressed his excitement with and support of the smartphone, believing it will support the country's economy and "instill national pride and self-respect".

The phone, model number AS1201, is a re-branded and re-badged Uniscope U1201 and runs a slightly modified version of Android 4.0.4.

The Arirang 171 (아리랑171) was released in 2018. The phone runs Android Nougat and contains a 2.6 GHz MT6797 chip from MediaTek. The Arirang 171 can connect to the Mirae public WiFi network.

See also

 Samjiyon tablet computer
 Notel

References

Smartphones
Economy of North Korea
Science and technology in North Korea